Kanganheri village is in Kapashera sub division of South West District in Delhi of the Indian state. It is located 12 km west of the District headquarters in kapashera. It is an Ahir dominant village. It is 9 km from Dwarka sub city and 1.5 km from Chhawla BSF camp.

Kangan Heri is surrounded by Gurgaon Tehsil (south), West Delhi Tehsil (north), Delhi Tehsil and South Delhi Tehsil (east).

Gurgaon, Delhi, Noida, Bahadurgarh, Jhajjar and Faridabad are the nearby cities.

Hindi is the local language.

Around 300 years ago the ancestors of Kangan Heri migrated from Kaneena of Rewari district in Haryana State. People of Kangan Heri give high respect to Kaneena and call it as Kaneena Dham (कणीणा धाम).

Most of the people are government servants, many of whom are in class one or two categories. Farming is also done by many people.

Education:
It has two government schools and two private school, that are given below:-
1. SDMC, up to primary level. 
2. Government Co-ed Senior secondary School, Kangan Heri, for senior secondary education.
3. Sri Krishna Vidyapeeth Public School.(Private School), from nursery to 5th class.
4. Cosmic world school

Worship places.
In spite of its small population, it has 4-5 temples in it.

There are two famous historical temples, Shri Radha Krishna temple and Shri Shiv temple.

People also have deep faith in "Dada Kheda".
A temple situated away from residential place but within the vicinity of Kangan Heri. The road leading to that temple is named as "Jai Dada Kheda Marg".

Political Background:
This area comes under Ghuman Hera ward. 
Recently Shashi Yadav is the councillor (Nigam Parsad), (B.J.P Party) belongs to Kangan Heri village.

Tourist Place:
A tourist place named HARITMA, which is built by Delhi government in this village attracts the tourist by its greenery and peaceful environment. And also attracts  most by its adventurous sports.

Facts & Findings:
3 Choupals with big open and built up space are also here, where every day activities of village taking place like om shanti classes, tailoring classes to girls, general village meetings etc.
This village also given officers like IAS Vandana Rao serving now as a SDM at Diu and IFS JYOTI YADAV.
Two Highways are purposed to be built in future from North and South direction of the village.
The people of this village are educated, well mannered, calm, hardworking and taking care of their culture and ancient traditions, providing their countless best in making India Great.

See also
 Najafgarh
 Dwarka
 Near by Dwarka metro station 9/10/11/12
Gurgoan sec 108/107/110  India

References

Villages in South West Delhi district